Brentwood Urban District was a local government district in south Essex, England from 1899 to 1974.

The district was created in 1899 from the parish of Brentwood which from 1894 had formed part of Billericay Rural District. 

In 1934 when Billericay Rural District was abolished, Brentwood Urban District gained the former area of the parishes of Hutton, Ingrave and South Weald. It also gained areas that had formed parts of other parishes from that district and from Romford Rural District.

The district was abolished in 1974 under the Local Government Act 1972 and its former area now forms part of Brentwood borough.

External links
Vision of Britain - Brentwood Urban District

Districts of England abolished by the Local Government Act 1972
Borough of Brentwood
Urban districts of England
1899 establishments in England